Jingju Temple, may refer to:

 Jingju Temple (Ji'an), in Ji'an, Jiangxi, China
 Jingju Temple (Xinyang), in Xinyang, Henan, China
 Jingju Temple (Yiwu), in Yiwu, Zhejiang, China
 Jingju Temple (Taizhou), in Taizhou, Zhejiang, China
 Jingju Temple (Mount Jiuhua), in Mount Jiuhua, Anhui, China